John II Crispo (or Giovanni; d. 1433) was the twelfth Duke of the Archipelago, etc., from 1418 to 1433, son of the tenth Duke Francesco I Crispo and wife Fiorenza I Sanudo, Lady of Milos and brother of Giacomo I and William II.

He married ca. 1420 Nobil Donna Francesca Morosini, Patrizia Veneta (–1455), and had three children: 
 Adriana Crispo, married to Domenico Sommaripa (–1466)
 Giacomo II Crispo
 Caterina Crispo (d. before 1454), unmarried and without issue

References
 Crispo family

1433 deaths
John 02
John 02
15th-century monarchs in Europe
15th-century Venetian people